Valdemar Söderholm (1909-1980) was a Swedish composer, organist, and music teacher.

Söderholm studied at the conservatory of Royal Swedish Academy of Music. He later taught at Royal College of Music and was held at high esteem as a Palestrina and Bach specialist. In particular, Anders Eliasson and Magnus Andersson were his students.

References

Swedish composers
1909 births
1980 deaths